In Canada, a registered third party is a "a person or group that wants to participate in or influence elections other than as a political party, electoral district association, nomination contestant or candidate." Third parties register with Elections Canada and are regulated under the terms of the Canada Elections Act.

Third parties are subject to different regulations for campaign and pre-campaign periods. There are no limits to what a third party can spend on political advertising pre-campaign — spending rules are only in force once the writ is dropped and the campaign has officially begun. A person or group must register as a third party immediately after incurring election advertising expenses totalling $500 or more.  There are strict limits on advertising expenses, as well as specific limits that can be incurred to promote or oppose the election of one or more candidates in a particular electoral district.

It is illegal for a third party and a registered political party or a candidate to collude with each other for the purpose of circumventing the maximum amount that a registered party is allowed for election expenses.

Federal general elections

2015 Election

Registered third parties

There were 112 registered third parties in the 2015 federal election:
A partial list includes the following:
 Canadian Media Guild
 Canadian Medical Association
 Diane Babcock
 Dogwood Initiative
 Downtown Mission of Windsor Inc.
 Fair Vote Canada
 Friends of Canadian Broadcasting
 IATSE
 LeadNow
 Les Sans-Chemise (Conseil National des Chômeurs et Chômeuses, National Council of Unemployed People)
 UNIFOR
 Voters Against Harper

2015 Advertising Spending Limits
Total election advertising expenses limit: $439,410.81
Total election advertising expenses limit in a given electoral district: $8,788.22

2011 Election

There were 55 registered third parties in the 2011 federal election:
 Ashraf Ali Rao
 Association of Canadian Community Colleges (ACCC)
 AVAAZ
 BC Health Coalition
 BCWF Political Action Alliance
 British Columbia Nurses' Union
 British Columbia Teachers' Federation
 Canadian Alliance of Student Associations
 Canadian Health Coalition
 Canadian Labour Congress
 Canadian Multicultural Association
 Canadian Shooting Sports Association
 Canadian Union of Public Employees
 Canadian Wheat Board Alliance
 Canadians Defending Democracy
 Canadians Rising Up For Democracy
 Catch 22 Campaign
 Catholic Civil Rights League
 CAW-Canada
 Child Care Advocacy Association of Canada (CCAAC)
 Citizens for Truth in Politics
 CMI – ICM Canadian Migration Institute
 Coalition for Gun Control
 Coalition of Child Care Advocates of BC
 Communications, Energy and Paperworkers Union of Canada (CEP)
 Conservation Voters of BC
 Council of Senior Citizens' Organizations of British Columbia
 Dogwood Initiative
 Elizabeth Will Group
 End Racism Now
 Friends of Canadian Broadcasting
 Gesher Canada
 Immigration Practitioners and Academics for a Just Immigration Policy
 International Fund for Animal Welfare Inc. (IFAW)
 International Association of Machinists and Aerospace Workers
 John W. Fossey
 Kam-Wing Chiu
 Les Sans-Chemise
 Matilda Wong
 National Citizens Coalition
 Project Democracy
 Public Service Alliance of Canada
 Richmond Watch
 Save Our Prison Farms
 Smart Tax Alliance – BC
 Society of Professional Engineers and Associates (SPEA)
 Sport Fishing Institute of BC
 The Council of Canadians
 The Professional Institute of the Public Service of Canada
 UFCW Canada
 Vancouver Fire Fighters' Union Local 18
 Whip Harper
 Wong John Gok Git
 Yee Lai Leung
 Yik-Lan Lo

References